Vehicle registration plates of Afghanistan started in 1970. The current version started in 2004. The dimensions of the license plates are approximately 420 x 175 mm (16.5 x 7 in).

License plates are bilingual in Afghanistan. Their general format includes the name of the province in either Persian or Pashto, with a corresponding Latin 3 Letter Code, a numerical code which ranges from 1 digit to 5 digits, and the class of the vehicle, identified by a Persian Letter, and a corresponding Latin Letter, or 3 in case of private vehicles.

However, the 5-digit code in the capital province of Kabul exhausted. Thus, on the license plates of this province, have an additional extra digit, only in Persian, located separately from the actual numerical code. In addition, two hyphens are shown at the top and the bottom of the 6th number.

Vehicle types

Provinces
In Afghanistan, license plates indicate the province in which the vehicle is registered in, both in Persian or Pashto, and with a 3-Letter Latin Code. Below is the Persian/Pashto Name of each province and the 3-letter code shown on the license plate for each province.

References

Afghanistan
Road transport in Afghanistan
Afghanistan transport-related lists